Vitaliy Ryabushko (born 24 March 1992, in Poltava, Ukraine) is a professional Ukrainian football forward.

References

External links 

Profile at Ukr-Football.org

1992 births
Living people
Sportspeople from Poltava
Ukrainian footballers
FC Kremin Kremenchuk players
FC Skala Stryi (2004) players
FC Inhulets Petrove players
MFC Mykolaiv players
Association football forwards